Valeriy Viktorovych Dubko (born 22 March 2001) is a Ukrainian professional footballer who plays as a centre-back for Belgian club Dender.

Career
Born in Donetsk, Dubko is a product of Azovstal-2 Mariupol and Shakhtar Donetsk youth sportive school systems. 

In August 2018, he was signed by Vorskla Poltava. He made his debut as a second half-time substituted player for Vorskla Poltava in the Ukrainian Premier League in a home winning match against Dnipro-1 on 19 June 2020.

References

External links
 
 

2001 births
Footballers from Donetsk
21st-century Ukrainian people
Living people
Ukrainian footballers
Ukraine under-21 international footballers
Association football defenders
FC Vorskla Poltava players
FC Chornomorets Odesa players
FC Zorya Luhansk players
F.C.V. Dender E.H. players
Ukrainian Premier League players
Challenger Pro League players
Ukrainian expatriate footballers
Expatriate footballers in Belgium
Ukrainian expatriate sportspeople in Belgium